U5 snRNA is a small nuclear RNA (snRNA) that participates in RNA splicing as a component of the spliceosome. It forms the U5 snRNP (small nuclear ribonucleoprotein) by associating with several proteins including Prp8 - the largest and most conserved protein in the spliceosome, Brr2 - a helicase required for spliceosome activation, Snu114, and the 7 Sm proteins. U5 snRNA forms a coaxially-stacked series of helices that project into the active site of the spliceosome. Loop 1, which caps this series of helices, forms 4-5 base pairs with the 5'-exon during the two chemical reactions of splicing. This interaction appears to be especially important during step two of splicing, exon ligation.

References

Further reading

External links 
 

Small nuclear RNA
Spliceosome
RNA splicing